Inglenook is an unincorporated community in Reed Township, Dauphin County, Pennsylvania, United States.
Inglenook is part of the Harrisburg–Carlisle Metropolitan Statistical Area.

References

Harrisburg–Carlisle metropolitan statistical area
Unincorporated communities in Dauphin County, Pennsylvania
Unincorporated communities in Pennsylvania